Lt. Otto Würfel (3 December 1920 – 22 December 1944) was a former Luftwaffe fighter ace and recipient of the Knight's Cross of the Iron Cross during World War II. Otto Würfel was credited with 79 arial victories all over the Eastern Front (World War II). In 1944 his aircraft had a mid air collision with another Luftwaffe aircraft over the Rogachev–Zhlobin offensive and he was captured by the Russians and died in a POW camp.

Career

Würfel began his career on March 10, 1939. In 1942 he was assigned to 9./JG 51. For a brief time he worked as a flight instructor. He accumulated 79 kills while fighting over the Eastern front. On February 23, 1944 Würfel was piloting his FW 190 over Rogachev when he collided with another Luftwaffe pilot: Heinrich Dittlmann. Würfel survived and was captured by the Russians. One parachute was seen after the crash. He was a prisoner of war and he contracted Typhus and died at Camp 280/5 near Stalino.

Awards
 Air Force Pilot Badge
 Ehrenpokal der Luftwaffe
 Frontflugspange für Jäger in Bronze
 Frontflugspange für Jäger in Silber
 Frontflugspange für Jäger in Gold
 German Cross 
 Iron Cross
 Knight's Cross of the Iron Cross May 1944

See also
 List of Knight's Cross of the Iron Cross recipients (W)
 List of World War II aces from Germany
 List of World War II flying aces

References

Notes

Bibliography

External links
Traces of War

1921 births
1944 deaths
German people who died in Soviet detention
German World War II flying aces
Luftwaffe pilots
Recipients of the Gold German Cross
Recipients of the Knight's Cross of the Iron Cross
German prisoners of war in World War II held by the Soviet Union
Deaths from typhus
Shot-down aviators
People from Uelzen
Military personnel from Lower Saxony